Palamós is a locality located in the municipality of Sant Guim de Freixenet, in Province of Lleida province, Catalonia, Spain. As of 2020, it has a population of 4.

Geography 
Palamós is located 80km east of Lleida.

References

Populated places in the Province of Lleida